The women's duet event at the 2010 Asian Games in Guangzhou, China, took place at the Foshan Aquatics Centre on 19 November.

Schedule
All times are China Standard Time (UTC+08:00)

Results 
Legend
FR — Reserve in free
RR — Reserve in technical and free
TR — Reserve in technical

References

External links 
 Synchronized swimming Official Report

Artistic swimming at the 2010 Asian Games